Thomas Pickering Pick (13 June 1841 – 6 September 1919) was a British surgeon and author. He edited the tenth through fourteenth editions of Gray's Anatomy, succeeding Timothy Holmes as editor. His other notable books include Fractures and Dislocations (Cassell & Co, 1885), A Treatise on Surgery (1875), and Surgery (1899).

Pickering Pick's father was a Liverpool merchant. At 16, he came to London and trained at St George's Hospital. He qualified for the Fellowship of the Royal College of Surgeons in 1866 and was elected as the hospital's assistant surgeon in 1869. From 1878 to 1898 he held the office of surgeon, then became a consulting surgeon prior to his 1900 retirement. For many years he was Inspector of Anatomy for England and Wales.

References

"Obituary: Thomas Pickering Pick, F.R.C.S.Eng." Br Med J. 1919 September 20; 2(3064): 399.

External links
 

1841 births
1919 deaths
British surgeons
British book editors
British medical writers
Fellows of the Royal College of Surgeons
People educated at the Royal Institution School